The KTM 1190 RC8 was a supersport bike made by KTM. The first generation 2008 model had a  V-twin engine and was the Austrian manufacturer's first-ever Superbike design. The RC8 model was supplemented with RC8 R models one year later in 2009 and the RC8 designation had its last year of production in 2010.  Current models from 2009 through 2013 use a  V-twin engine with a twin spark per cylinder technology  design debuting on the 2011 model which is a rare supersport bike.

Design

The first concept of the bike appeared in 2005, powered by the Super Duke  v-twin. The bike has a steel trellis frame with a cast aluminium seat subframe. The suspension uses high-end inverted forks and an alloy, double-sided swingarm made by WP, a KTM subsidiary. The bike for 2013 and on comes in a single color, black and white with orange accents.

RC8 R

2010

The RC8 R was delivered to the United States in 2010 as a 2011 model with more track-oriented features than the standard RC8. It has titanium intake valves and a low-friction diamond-like carbon (DLC) treatment on its camshafts' finger followers. The RC8 R's WP suspension includes a 43 mm inverted fork at the front end, with a titanium-aluminum-nitride low-stiction coating on its sliders. A high-end shock supports the bike's rear, and its piston rod is also finished with the titanium-aluminum-nitride coating. The fork has three modes of adjustment (compression damping, rebound damping and spring preload), while the shock separates the compression damping into high and low speed circuits and has ride-height adjustability. An adjustable steering damper completes the suspension.

The RC8 R offers many chassis adjustments not found on other superbikes. In addition to the suspension, the rider can adjust many other parts on the bike including the front brake lever, the rear brake pedal, the clutch lever, the handlebars, the shifter, the footpegs, and the seat/subframe height. Essentially, the adjustable options allow the RC8 R to accommodate riders of various sizes.

2011 and 2012

Internal improvements were made for these model years based on rider reviews and in-house testing. 250 models were made for North America for 2011 and 2012 years. The KTM engineers included a heavier crankshaft and flywheel aimed at reducing the buzzy nature of the previous RC8R and to emphasize low-end torque.  Throttle butterflies were remapped to reduce the amount of opening under small throttle inputs for much smoother transitions and to address the "snatchy throttle" complaints directed at the earlier models.  The new cylinder head uses two spark plugs in each cylinder; below 7,000 rpm only one of the two fires, while above 7,000 both are used for optimum burning and reduced detonation which also allows for a re-tuned ECU that has revamped cam timing and the 52 mm throttle bodies.  Also new with this model are cast aluminum Marchesini wheels and strategic front and rear suspension updates.

Racing
At the launch of the RC8 superbike KTM announced it will race the RC8 in the FIM Superstock championship in 2008. KTM's two-year plan is to get the bike regularly on the podium in superstock before moving up to the Superbike World Championship.  For 2009 the KTM RC8 Super Cup has been running as a one make support class at selected rounds of the British Superbike Championship, and in 2010 Redline KTM are competing in the newly formed BSB Evo class with rider James Edmeades.

For 2012, Chris Filmore riding for the KTM Factory Racing team earned his career best finish at the final round of the AMA Pro SuperBike Series held at NOLA Motorsports Park on October 6 finishing 4th that day, 5th place the next, ending the season 11th overall and signed with the team for 2013.

Specifications
All specifications are manufacturer claimed.

References

External links
KTM.com [archive] Official RC8 website
KTM RC8 review Road test of the KTM RC8

RC8R
Motorcycles introduced in 2008
Sport bikes